William Werner Boone (16 January 1920 in Cincinnati – 14 September 1983 in Urbana, Illinois) was an American mathematician. He completed his undergrad degree as a part time student at the University of Cincinnati.

Alonzo Church was his Ph.D. advisor at Princeton, and Kurt Gödel was his friend at the Institute for Advanced Study.

Pyotr Novikov showed in 1955 that there exists a finitely presented group G such that the word problem for G is undecidable. A different proof was obtained by Boone in 1958.

Selected publications
W. W. Boone, Decision problems about algebraic and logical systems as a whole and recursively enumerable degrees of unsolvability. 1968 Contributions to Math. Logic (Colloquium, Hannover, 1966), North-Holland, Amsterdam.
W. W. Boone, Roger Lyndon, Frank Cannonito, Word Problems: Decision Problem in Group Theory, North-Holland, 1973.

References

Kurt Gödel: Collected Works: Oxford University Press: New York.  Editor-in-chief: Solomon Feferman, Volume IV: Correspondence, A–G, .

1920 births
1983 deaths
20th-century American mathematicians
University of Cincinnati alumni
Princeton University alumni
American logicians
University of Illinois Urbana-Champaign faculty
People from Cincinnati
Mathematicians from Ohio
Group theorists